Emil Polit (born 11 October 1940) is a Polish painter known for his works on canvas and church murals. He is a portrait artist and painter of religious works which are exhibited in many churches in Poland and held in numerous collections including at the National Museum of Przemyśl, Art Exhibitions Bureau's Exhibition Center in Rzeszów, and at the Vatican.

Early life and education 
Polit was born on 11 October 1940, in Zmysłówka, Poland. In 1954, he began attending the Fine Arts Preparatory Academy in Jarosław. From 1959, he studied at The Academy of Fine Arts in Krakow where he trained under Polish artist . Polit graduated with a Master of Fine Arts in painting and lithography in 1965.

Career 
After graduate school, Polit settled in Rzeszów, Poland, where he was inducted into the Polish Professional Artists' Association in 1966.

In 1988, Polit began teaching at State Secondary School of Fine Arts in Rzeszów. Polit served as an artistic painting and drawing teacher until his retirement in 2006. He also served there as the chair of the art department for a number of years. He was also the director of the local chapter of the Polish Professional Artists' Association from 1989 to 1991.

Polit's support for his community includes donating to a number of organizations through annual art auctions. Some of the more notable events are the Polish Contemporary Art Auctions coordinated through the Polish Consulate in New York City and his Indianapolis exhibits supporting public television. Others are donations to benefit the St. Albert Society in Rzeszów, where he was awarded in 2002 with the Society's recognition award for exceptional generosity and his continuing support for Children's Hospice charities of Southeastern Poland. Polit also actively supports the Catholic Charities of the Rzeszów region and other local charities.

Works 
Polit initially focused on industrial art design in parallel with his lifelong pursuit of painting and drawing. Later, he transitioned to painting full-time. He designed the altar and also painted the large frescos that adorned the church's interior walls, including murals of Jesus and patron saints of the diocese, Józef Sebastian Pelczar and Karolina Kózka. Also at the cathedral is Polit's rendition of the Stations of the Cross, a traditional series of images depicting Jesus on the day of his crucifixion.

Polit's religious works can also be found in Rzeszów, Matysówka, Trzebownisko, Nowa Dęba, Sonina, Rogóżno, and Łukawiec. His secular works often draw inspiration from his personal life. He often paints self-portraits as well as portraits of his friends and family including his wife, sons and grandchildren. His portraits are depicted in intimate scenes and in a highly stylized form unique to the artist.

Awards 
In 1996, Polit received the Rzeszów Heritage Award for contributions to "shaping and developing the region's art environment". In 2003, he named as the National Art Educator for his contributions to art education in Poland.

Exhibitions 
Polit's work has been shown at more than 20 individual exhibitions, including:

 1980 – W. Siemaszkowa Theater, Rzeszów
 1981 and 1983 – Fine Art Studio, Holyoke, Massachusetts
 1984 – Polish Culture Festival, Springfield, Massachusetts
 2004 – Masterpiece Gallery, Indianapolis, Indiana
 1994 – Zamek Romantyczny, Łańcut
 1995 – Jubilee Painting Exhibition, Art Exhibitions Bureau, Rzeszów
 1997 – Galeria 13, Rzeszów
 1998 – Katedra, Sala Papieska, Rzeszów
 1999 – Muzeum Diecezjalne. Rzeszów
 2000 – Galeria Sztuki Współczesnej, Przemyśl
 2001 – Galeria w Podwórzu, Rzeszów
 2004 – Masterpiece Gallery, Indianapolis
 2005 – Diocese Museum, Rzeszów
 2005 – 40th Anniversary Exhibit, Art Exhibitions Bureau, Rzeszów
 2006 – Masterpiece Gallery, Indianapolis
 2008 – Masterpiece Gallery, Indianapolis

References

External links 

1940 births
20th-century births
Living people
People from Leżajsk County
Polish painters
Polish male painters